Marshall Wayne See (November 3, 1923 – July 22, 2019) was an American professional basketball player. He played in 1949–50 for the Waterloo Hawks during their only season in the National Basketball Association and scored 320 points for Waterloo. See was the first professional basketball player to come out of Northern Arizona University.

References

1923 births
2019 deaths
American men's basketball players
Basketball players from Arizona
Guards (basketball)
Northern Arizona Lumberjacks football players
Northern Arizona Lumberjacks men's basketball players
People from Yavapai County, Arizona
Undrafted National Basketball Association players
Waterloo Hawks players